Conn may refer to:

 Conn (name), a family name and a masculine given name
 Conn, mythological son of Ler from the Children of Lir legend
 Conn of the Hundred Battles, a figure from Irish mythology
 Jerome W. Conn, American endocrinologist
 Connecticut, State in the northeastern United States
 Connecticut College, a liberal arts college in New London, Connecticut, USA
 Conn, Louisiana, United States
 Conn, Mississippi, United States
 Conn, Ontario, Canada
 Conn (nautical), the duty of giving directions for movement from the deck of a ship to the helm
 C.G. Conn, Inc., a manufacturer of musical instruments
 CONN (functional connectivity toolbox), a cross-platform imaging software program